{{DISPLAYTITLE:C8H16O4}}
The molecular formula C8H16O4 (molar mass: 176.21 g/mol, exact mass: 176.104859 u) may refer to:

 12-Crown-4, or 1,4,7,10-tetraoxacyclododecane
 Cladinose
 Metaldehyde

Molecular formulas